Richard Arends (born 5 September 1990) is a Dutch footballer who last played as a goalkeeper for Kozakken Boys in the Dutch Tweede Divisie.

Club career
He played for FC Oss, SV DFS and moved abroad for a spell in Iceland with Keflavík FC. He returned to Holland in summer 2015 to join SV Spakenburg. From the 2017–18 season, Arends began playing for Kozakken Boys. In January 2021, it was announced that he would leave at the end of the season.

References

External links
 

1990 births
Living people
People from Neder-Betuwe
Association football goalkeepers
Dutch footballers
TOP Oss players
Knattspyrnudeild Keflavík players
SV Spakenburg players
Kozakken Boys players
Eerste Divisie players
Tweede Divisie players
Derde Divisie players
Dutch expatriate footballers
Expatriate footballers in Iceland
Dutch expatriate sportspeople in Iceland
Footballers from Gelderland